Michael Güntner (born 3 January 1968) is an Austrian ice hockey player. He competed in the men's tournament at the 1994 Winter Olympics.

References

External links
 

1968 births
Living people
Austrian ice hockey players
Olympic ice hockey players of Austria
Ice hockey players at the 1994 Winter Olympics
People from Kapfenberg
Sportspeople from Styria